Weldon Edison "Lefty" West (September 3, 1915 – July 23, 1979) was a Major League Baseball pitcher who played for the St. Louis Browns in 1944 and 1945.

West made his big league debut on April 30, 1944 at the age of 28. He spent 11 games with the Browns that season, posting a 0–0 record with a 6.29 ERA. In 24 innings, he allowed 34 hits and 19 walks while striking out 11 batters.

In 1945, he appeared in 24 games, starting eight of them. He posted a record of 3–4 with an ERA of 3.63, allowing 71 hits in 74 innings of work while walking 31 batters and striking out 38. He appeared in his final big league game on September 15, 1945.

Overall, West went 3–4 with a 4.29 ERA in 35 major league games. In 98 innings, he allowed 105 hits, three home runs and 50 walks while striking out 49 batters. As a batter, he hit .088 in 34 at-bats.

West also spent nine seasons in the minor leagues, going 59–94 in 193 games. In 1,412 innings, he allowed 1,376 hits and 607 strikeouts. With the Americus Pioneers in 1939, West went 19–11 with a 2.91 ERA. Though he allowed 139 runs in 294 innings of work that year, only 95 of them were earned. 

In 1940, he and his wife were living in Kernersville, North Carolina. Following his death, he was interred at Forest Lawn Memorial Park in Hendersonville.

References

Major League Baseball pitchers
St. Louis Browns players
Americus Pioneers players
Durham Bulls players
Leaksville-Draper-Spray Triplets players
Lexington Indians players
Macon Peaches players
Memphis Chickasaws players
Oakland Oaks (baseball) players
Pensacola Pilots players
Springfield Rifles players
Winston-Salem Twins players
Baseball players from North Carolina
1915 births
1979 deaths
People from Gibsonville, North Carolina